Shandar in Iran may refer to:
 Shandar, Gilan
 Shandar, West Azerbaijan